Kentucky Route 1977 (KY 1977) is an urban secondary state highway located entirely in northern Fayette County in East Central Kentucky. The  mainly traverses the northwestern outskirts of Lexington.

Route description 
KY 1977 originates along Old Frankfort Pike (KY 1681) northwest of the city center. It crosses Leestown Pike (US 421) after  into the route. KY 1977 then makes a right turn onto Spurr Road from Yarnallton Pike and ends with a junction with Georgetown Road (US 25 in the Greendale neighborhood.

Major intersections

References

1977
1977